Aktaş is a village in the Ovacık District, Tunceli Province, Turkey. The village is populated by Kurds of the Bahtiyar tribe and had a population of 27 in 2021.

The hamlets of Beşpınar, Hıdıran, Mollalar and Tepe are attached to the village.

References 

Kurdish settlements in Tunceli Province
Villages in Ovacık District